John Dwyer (born 10 July 1928) was an Australian field hockey player. He competed in the men's tournament at the 1956 Summer Olympics.

References

External links
 

1928 births
Living people
Australian male field hockey players
Olympic field hockey players of Australia
Field hockey players at the 1956 Summer Olympics
Place of birth missing (living people)
20th-century Australian people
21st-century Australian people